Sankt Gerold is an album by pianist Paul Bley, bassist Barre Phillips, and saxophonist Evan Parker recorded in 1996 and released on the ECM label in 2000.

Reception
The AllMusic review by Thom Jurek stated: "This performance is a watermark in the careers of all three participants and an essential document for the fans of any single member as well as the evolution of the improvising jazz trio".

Track listing 
All compositions by Paul Bley, Evan Parker & Barre Phillips except as indicated
 "Variation 1" - 10:18 
 "Variation 2" - 7:16 
 "Variation 3" (Phillips) - 3:00 
 "Variation 4" (Parker) - 2:02 
 "Variation 5" - 6:20 
 "Variation 6" (Bley) - 3:56 
 "Variation 7" (Phillips) - 7:13 
 "Variation 8" - 8:19 
 "Variation 9" (Bley) - 7:03 
 "Variation 10" (Parker) - 5:25 
 "Variation 11" - 4:49 
 "Variation 12" (Parker) - 1:29 
Recorded at Monastery of Sankt Gerold in Austria in April 1996.

Personnel
 Paul Bley — piano 
 Evan Parker — tenor saxophone, soprano saxophone 
 Barre Phillips — bass

References

ECM Records albums
Paul Bley albums
2000 albums
Albums produced by Manfred Eicher